The 1957–58 Divizia A was the fortieth season of Divizia A, the top-level football league of Romania.

Teams

League table

Results

Top goalscorers

Champion squad

See also 

 1957–58 Divizia B

References

Liga I seasons
Romania
1957–58 in Romanian football